The West Coast rugby league team are New Zealand rugby league team that represents the West Coast Rugby League. They have been nicknamed the Chargers.

History
The West Coast side played its first match against Canterbury, losing 30–16 on 3 June 1915 at Victoria Park, Greymouth. That night the West Coast Rugby League was formed. Canterbury then played Blackball the next day, winning 23-10 before defeating Hokitika 33–8 on 5 June.

The team for the West Coast was; H. Lawrence, L. Smith, L. Hunter, A. Hobson, W. Kirk, Hay, R. Watts, J. Rear, S.Bligh, A. Kells, D. McCann, T. Todd, J. Stenhouse.

They next played in 1919 when they lost to Canterbury 5–3.

The West Coast recorded their first win in 1923 when they defeated Wellington 12–6. They first defeated Canterbury in 1931, winning 37–19, before following it up the following year with a 53–26 win.

Since then rugby league has traditionally been the most successful team sport in the West Coast. However, since the 1990s the West Coast has usually participated in Second Division or South Island competitions and in particular the West Coast missed out on having a team in either the Lion Red Cup or Bartercard Cup, the two main New Zealand Rugby League competitions of the 1990s and 2000s.

Despite this, the West Coast has had some success in recent years. In the 1995 season the West Coast won the South Island division of the National Provincial competition and advanced to the final, losing to Wellington. The NPC was that year an invitational competition due to the Lion Red Cup.

However, in 1997 the West Coast Chargers advanced to the semi finals of a full national competition, losing to Canterbury 24–40 in an away semi final.

In 2000 the West Coast competed in the Mainland Super 10, a competition involving three South Island districts and seven Canterbury Rugby League clubs. The West Coast Chargers performed below expectations and finished eighth. The West Coast declined to take part in the 2001 edition of the competition after it was moved to the first half of the season.

In 2004 the West Coast played the touring Russian national team.

The West Coast is currently represented by the South Island team in the National Zonal Competition.

Notable players

The West Coast has produced many New Zealand national rugby league team including Jock Butterfield, Bill McLennan, George Menzies, Whetu Taewa and Kiwis coach Cecil Mountford.

References

New Zealand rugby league teams
Rugby league on the West Coast, New Zealand
1915 establishments in New Zealand